Nagarevi Cave Natural Monument is a karst cave located near village Godogani, Terjola Municipality in Imereti region of Georgia, 199 meters above sea level. It is located on the left slope of the scenic Cheshura Gorge across the river from monastery.

Morphology 
Nagarevi Cave formed in Cretaceous limestones in Okriba karst massif. Cave total length is 140 m. From entrance main pathway descends spirally downstream and forms a narrow tunnel. The front part of the cave has two storeys layout. Further down cave has several narrow branches and small halls. There are fragments of terraces. Cave speleothems are poorly developed. Small stream at the junction of the cave branches is always present. During the rains it is completely filled with water.

Fauna 
The inhabitants of the cave include Oxychilus, Minunthozetes, Oribatula and Oribella.

See also 
Navenakhevi Cave Natural Monument
Tsutskhvati Cave Natural Monument
Sakajia Cave Natural Monument

References

Natural monuments of Georgia (country)
Caves of Georgia (country)
Protected areas established in 2013
Geography of Samegrelo-Zemo Svaneti